Piezophidion thoracicum is a species of beetle in the family Cerambycidae. It was described by Martins, Galileo and de-Oliveira in 2009.

References

Elaphidiini
Beetles described in 2009